Kelly Bailey may refer to:
 Kelly Bailey (Misfits), a fictional character from the British TV series Misfits
 Kelly Bailey (composer), composer and game designer
 Kelly Bailey (actress) (born 1998), actress and model

See also
Bailey (surname)